Jaÿsinia (3.7 hectares) is a botanical garden specializing in alpine flowers, located in Samoëns, Haute-Savoie, Rhône-Alpes, France. It is open daily except when there is snow on the ground; admission is free.

The garden was established in 1906 by Marie-Louise Cognac-Jaÿ, a native of Samoëns and founder of La Samaritaine department store in Paris, to designs by Louis-Jules Allemand. It opened in 1909. Since 1936 it has been directed by the Scientific Division of Botany from the National Museum of Natural History.

The garden now contains about 8,000 plants from around the world, representing some 4,500 types of alpine flowers (including the rare Iris perrieri,) and 500 varieties of trees and shrubs. It is established at an altitude of 700–800 meters above sea level on a steep, south-facing limestone slope overlooking the old village, with garden features that include ruins of the Tornalta castle (12th century), a chapel (1687), and fountains and cascades. The Maison de la Jaÿsinia is at the garden's entrance, with a reception area providing information about the garden and the history of its founder.

See also 
 List of botanical gardens in France

References 

Notes
 Samoens.com description
 Gralon.net entry
 1001 Fleurs entry
 Jardinez entry
 Ialpes entry
 Jardins et Paysages entry
 123 Savoie description

Gardens in Haute-Savoie
Botanical gardens in France